Alexander Christopher Haugg (born 31 August 1968 in Hamburg, West Germany) is a German actor who became known in Germany by playing in a TV-series called Gegen den Wind.

He was trained as an actor by former German actress, dancer and singer Margot Hoepfner.

Since 2002 he has been living in Berlin and has joined several theatre and TV-productions.

References

External links
 

1968 births
Living people
German male television actors
Male actors from Hamburg